Waverly is a city in Coffey County, Kansas, United States.  As of the 2020 census, the population of the city was 574.

History
Waverly was founded in 1878. It was named by a pioneer settler for his hometown of Waverly, Indiana.

The first post office in Waverly was established on June 10, 1878.

Geography
Waverly is located at  (38.394745, -95.602354).

Climate
The climate in this area is characterized by hot, humid summers and generally mild to cool winters.  According to the Köppen Climate Classification system, Waverly has a humid subtropical climate, abbreviated "Cfa" on climate maps.

Demographics

2010 census
As of the census of 2010, there were 592 people, 229 households, and 147 families living in the city. The racial makeup of the city was 96.5% White, 0.7% Native American, 0.2% Asian, and 2.7% from two or more races. Hispanic or Latino of any race were 2.7% of the population.

There were 229 households, of which 33.2% had children under the age of 18 living with them, 47.6% were married couples living together, 10.9% had a female householder with no husband present, 5.7% had a male householder with no wife present, and 35.8% were non-families. 31.9% of all households were made up of individuals, and 12.3% had someone living alone who was 65 years of age or older. The average household size was 2.41 and the average family size was 3.01.

The median age in the city was 39.2 years. 25.7% of residents were under the age of 18; 6.9% were between the ages of 18 and 24; 21.5% were from 25 to 44; 25.5% were from 45 to 64; and 20.3% were 65 years of age or older. The gender makeup of the city was 44.6% male and 55.4% female.

2000 census
As of the census of 2000, there were 589 people, 233 households, and 147 families living in the city. The racial makeup of the city was 97.45% White, 0.85% Native American, 0.68% from other races, and 1.02% from two or more races. Hispanic or Latino of any race were 1.70% of the population.

There were 233 households, out of which 33.9% had children under the age of 18 living with them, 52.8% were married couples living together, 5.2% had a female householder with no husband present, and 36.9% were non-families. 33.0% of all households were made up of individuals, and 16.3% had someone living alone who was 65 years of age or older. The average household size was 2.36 and the average family size was 2.99.

In the city, the population was spread out, with 24.8% under the age of 18, 8.3% from 18 to 24, 22.6% from 25 to 44, 20.2% from 45 to 64, and 24.1% who were 65 years of age or older. The median age was 40 years. For every 100 females, there were 82.9 males. For every 100 females age 18 and over, there were 80.8 males.

The median income for a household in the city was $29,844, and the median income for a family was $38,472. Males had a median income of $30,446 versus $18,571 for females. The per capita income for the city was $15,733. About 4.1% of families and 8.7% of the population were below the poverty line, including 5.6% of those under age 18 and 11.8% of those age 65 or over.

Education
The community is served by Lebo–Waverly USD 243 public school district.

Notable people
 Olive Ann Beech (born Olive Ann Mellor in Waverly), U.S. aviation pioneer and businesswoman

References

Further reading

External links
 City of Waverly
 Waverly - Directory of Public Officials
 Waverly city map, KDOT

Cities in Kansas
Cities in Coffey County, Kansas